Acidimangrovimonas sediminis is a Gram-negative, aerobic, rod-shaped and non-motile bacterium from the genus of Acidimangrovimonas which has been isolated from mangrove sediments from the Jiulong River in China.

References

Rhodobacteraceae
Bacteria described in 2019